Callot is a French surname. People named Callot include:

Georges Callot (1857–1903), French genre painter
Henri Callot (1875–1956), French fencer
Jacques Callot (c. 1592 – 1635), French printmaker
Jean-Baptiste-Irénée Callot (1814–1875), French Roman Catholic Bishop